The Chopper City Boyz was a New Orleans-based rap group signed to rapper B.G.'s Chopper City Records. The group was formed in 2003 consisting of B.G.'s younger brother Hakizzle, Gar and Snipe, then VL Mike became an addition to the group in early 2004. The group had been featured on B.G.'s solo albums as well as several mixtapes between 2003 and 2006. The group released their debut album with B.G. titled We Got This in 2007, spawning the single "Make 'Em Mad", which was produced by David Banner. The group did exceptionally well for being on an independent record label, Koch Records, selling 36,000 in their first week on the chart.

Former members
VL Mike (deceased)
Snipe
Hakizzle
Gar

Discography

Albums
2007: We Got This (with B.G.)
2008: Life in the Concrete Jungle (with B.G.)

Mixtapes
2006: We Got This

Singles
2006: "Make 'Em Mad"
2008: "Bubblegum"
2008: "Keep It Real"

References

American hip hop groups
Musical groups from New Orleans